George Granville Barker (26 February 1913 – 27 October 1991) was an English poet, identified with the New Apocalyptics movement, which reacted against 1930s realism with mythical and surrealistic themes. His long liaison with Elizabeth Smart was the subject of her cult-novel By Grand Central Station I Sat Down and Wept.

Life and work
Barker was born in Loughton, near Epping Forest in Essex, England, to English father George Barker (1879–1965), a temporary police constable and former batman in the Coldstream Guards (during World War I, when he returned to the regiment, he earned a field commission to the rank of Major) who later worked as a butler at Gray's Inn, and Irish mother Marion Frances (1881–1953), née Taaffe, from Mornington, County Meath, near Drogheda, Ireland; the couple moved to Chelsea when Barker was six months old. His younger brother was the painter Kit Barker; they were raised at Battersea, London, and the family later lived at Upper Addison Gardens, Holland Park.

Barker was educated at an L.C.C. school and at Regent Street Polytechnic. Having left school at an early age, he pursued several odd jobs, before settling on a career in writing. Early volumes by Barker include Thirty Preliminary Poems (1933), Poems (1935) and Calamiterror (1937), which was inspired by the Spanish Civil War, and contains an attack
on the Spanish Nationalists.

In his early twenties, Barker had already been published by T.S. Eliot at Faber and Faber, who also helped him to gain appointment as Professor of English Literature in 1939 at Tohoku University (Sendai, Miyagi, Japan). He left there in 1940 due to the hostilities, but wrote Pacific Sonnets during his tenure.

He then travelled to the United States, where he began his longtime liaison with writer Elizabeth Smart, by whom he had four of his fifteen children. Barker also had three children by his first wife, Jessica. He returned to England in 1943. From the late 1960s until his death, he lived in Itteringham, Norfolk, with his wife, the writer and journalist Elspeth Barker. In 1969, he published the poem At Thurgarton Church, the village of Thurgarton being a few miles from Itteringham.

Barker's 1950 novel, The Dead Seagull, described his affair with Smart, whose 1945 novel By Grand Central Station I Sat Down and Wept was also about the affair. His Collected Poems were edited by Robert Fraser and published in 1987 by Faber and Faber. Barker was partly associated with the New Apocalyptics movement, which reacted against 1930s realism with surrealistic and mythical themes. However, his characteristically independent idiosyncrasies set him off as an individual in his own right.

An uneven writer, Barker's masterpiece was considered by C.H. Sisson to be The True Confession of George Barker.

In describing the difficulties in writing his biography, Barker was quoted as saying: "I've stirred the facts around too much ... It simply can't be done." However, Robert Fraser produced a biography, The Chameleon Poet: A Life of George Barker, in 2001.

Bibliography

Thirty Preliminary Poems, David Archer (1933)
Alanna Autumnal, London : Wishart (1933)
Poems, Faber & Faber (1935)
Janus(The Documents of a Death.-The Bacchant.) [Two tales.], Faber & Faber (1935)
Calamiterror, Faber & Faber (1937)
Elegy on Spain, Manchester : Contemporary Bookshop (1939)
Lament and Triumph, Faber & Faber (1940)
Selected Poems,  New York : Macmillan Co (1941)
Eros in Dogma, Faber & Faber (1944)
Love Poems,  New York : Dial Press (1947)
News of the world, Faber (1950)
The Dead Seagull, Farrar, Straus & Young New York (1951)
A vision of beasts and gods, Faber (1954)
Collected Poems, 1930–1955. Faber & Faber  (1957)
The view from a blind I, Faber (1962)
The True Confession of George Barker, MacGibbon & Kee (1965)
Dreams of a summer night, Faber & Faber (1966)
The golden chains, Faber (1968)
At Thurgarton Church, A poem with drawings, etc., London : Trigram Press (1969).
Runes and Rhymes, Tunes and Chimes, illustrated by George Adamson, Faber & Faber (1969)
To Aylsham Fair, illustrated by George Adamson, Faber & Faber (1970) 
Essays, MacGibbon & Kee (1970)
Poems of places and people, Faber and Faber (1971)
III hallucination poems, New York City : Helikon Press (1972)
The alphabetical zoo, Illustrated by Krystyna Roland, Faber and Faber (1972)
Homage to George Barker on his sixtieth birthday, edited by John Heath-Stubbs and Martin Green, Martin Brian & O'Keeffe (1973)
Dialogues etc., Faber (1976)
Seven poems, Greville Press (1977)
Anno Domini, Faber and Faber (1983)
Villa Stellar Faber and Faber (1983)
The Jubjub Bird or some Remarks on the Prose Poem, Greville Press, (1985)
Collected Poems of George Barker, Faber and Faber, (1987)
Mir Poets Thirteen: Three Poems, Word Press (1988)
Seventeen, Greville Press, (1988)
Street ballads,  Faber & Faber (1992)
Selected Poems, edited by Robert Fraser, Faber and Faber (1995)
Dibby Dubby Dhu and other poems, illustrated by Sara Fanelli, Faber (1997) 
The Chameleon Poet: A Life of George Barker, Robert Fraser, Jonathan Cape Ltd (2002)
Poems by George Barker, selected by Elspeth Barker, Greville Press (2004)

References

Further reading
Daniel Farson, Soho in the Fifties (Michael Joseph, London, 1987).
An Anthology from X (Oxford University Press, 1988) 
Patrick Swift 1927-83 (Gandon Editions, Kinsale, 1993).
Selected Poems, HOMAGE TO GEORGE BARKER (On his Sixtieth Birthday). John Heath-Stubbs  & Martin Green, eds, 1973. Includes portrait of Barker by Swift seen here.
The Chameleon Poet: A Life of George Barker, Jonathan Cape Ltd (21 Feb 2002), 
The Spoken Word: George Barker [Audiobook], 
 Barker, Christopher, The Arms of the Infinite: Elizabeth Smart and George Barker" (Wilfrid Laurier University Press, 2010'')

External links

Essay by Robert Fraser, Open University
Short informal biography with links to some of Barker's poems
Barker's Grave
More links to Barker's poems

 A large collection of Barker's papers is located at the Harry Ransom Humanities Research Center at The University of Texas at Austin.
George Barker collection at University of Victoria, Special Collections
George Barker Collection, 1930-1966 at Southern Illinois University Carbondale, Special Collections Research Center.
Truly, madly, deeply - Peter Wilby, The Guardian, 2008
Master of the red Martini - Ian Sansom, Guardian
Bohemians - The European Graduate School
Paul Potts on ‘The World of George Barker’
George Barker - Richard Poole
Archival Material at  
Papers of George Barker at the British Library with links to other Barker collections
George Barker papers at the University of Maryland Libraries
George Barker Collection General Collection, Beinecke Rare Book and Manuscript Library, Yale University.

1913 births
1991 deaths
People from Loughton
Academic staff of Tohoku University
20th-century English poets
People from Itteringham
English male poets
20th-century English male writers